Manuel Calvente Gorbas (born 14 August 1976 in Granada) is a Spanish former road bicycle racer, who competed professionally between 2002 and 2010 for the , ,  and  teams.

Major results

2005
 22nd, Overall, Vuelta a España
2008
 1st, Overall, Vuelta a La Rioja

External links 

1976 births
Living people
Spanish male cyclists
Sportspeople from Granada
Cyclists from Andalusia